Waxy corn or glutinous corn is a type of  field corn characterized by its sticky texture when cooked as a result of larger amounts of amylopectin. The corn was first described from a specimen from China in 1909. As this plant showed many peculiar traits, the American breeders long used it as a genetic marker to tag the existence of hidden genes in other maize breeding programs. In 1922 a researcher found that the endosperm of waxy maize contained only amylopectin  and no amylose starch molecule in opposition to normal dent corn varieties that contain both. Until World War II, the main source of starch in the United States was tapioca, but when Japan severed the supply lines of the U.S., they forced processors to turn to waxy maize. Amylopectin or waxy starch is now used mainly in food products, but also in the textile, adhesive, corrugating and paper industry.  

When feeding trials later on showed that waxy maize could produce more efficient feed gains than normal dent maize, interest in waxy maize suddenly expanded. Geneticists could show that waxy maize has a defect in metabolism precluding the synthesis of amylose in the endosperm. It is coded by a single recessive gene (wx). Waxy maize yield about 3.5% less than their normal dent counterparts and has to be isolated from any nearby normal maize fields by at least 200 meters.

History
The exact history of waxy maize is unknown. The first mentions of it were found in the archives of the U.S. Department of Agriculture (USDA). In 1908, the Rev. J. M. W. Farnham, a Presbyterian missionary in Shanghai, sent a sample of seeds to the U.S. Office of Foreign Seed and Plant Introduction. A note with the seeds called it: "A peculiar kind of corn. There are several colours, but they are said to be all the same variety. The corn is much more glutinous than the other varieties, so far as I know, and may be found to be of some use, perhaps as porridge." These seeds were planted on May 9, 1908, near Washington, D.C., by a botanist named Guy N. Collins. He was able to grow 53 plants to maturity and made a thorough characterisation of these plants, including photographs, which were published in a USDA bulletin issued in December 1909.

In 1915, the plant was rediscovered in Upper Burma and in 1920 in the Philippines. Kuleshov, when screening the distribution of maize in Asia, found it in many other places.

The discovery in China of a distinct type of maize bears the historical question whether maize was known in the Orient before the discovery of America. The question was considered closed at the end of the 19th century by De Candolle who stated: "Maize is of American origin, and has only been introduced into the old world since the discovery of the new. I consider these two assertions as positive, in spite of the contrary opinion of some authors."

But the finding of this unique variety of maize suggested a re-examination of the question. He also states that Portuguese arrived in China in 1516, simultaneously introducing maize. Collins supposed that waxy maize has arisen by a way of mutation in Upper Burma. For some scholars it was difficult to conceive that from 1516 on the American plant had had time to penetrate into a wild country inaccessible to foreigners, to produce a mutation, and as such a mutant to spread from the Philippines to Northern Manchuria and the Primorsky region within three to four hundred years.

Nowadays we are able to counterpart both of these arguments. At first we know that the waxy mutation is quite common (see #Genetics). Secondly, the fact that maize, if introduced into Asia in Post-Columbian times, must have been rapidly accepted merely indicates that, like the potato in Ireland, it met an acute and pressing need.

Goodrich states that there are now in China some 6000 local histories called gazetteers written from A.D. 347 on. Maize was first accurately described in one of them, published in the sixteenth century.
Ho, an eminent Chinese historian, stated: "Summing up the introduction of maize into China, we may say that maize was introduced into China two or three decades before 1550 . . . " It might be, as various students concluded, that maize reached Asia before 1492, but currently we are not aware of a single plant fragment, artifact, illustration, or written record to prove it. Therefore, any undocumented statement about its occurrence there in earlier times is to be regarded with scepticism until substantiated. Thus, the two assertions of De Candolle are still valid.

In his publication, Collins characterised the new plants as possessing a number of unique characteristics No indications of these characteristics in any recorded form of Zea mays had thus far been found. Several of the unique features combine to enable the plant to resist the drying out of the silks by dry, hot winds at the time of flowering. Although the plants produced such small ears that they could find no place in direct competition with the improved varieties, the possession of this adaptation gave the new type an economic interest, particularly in some parts of the semiarid Southwest. Consequently, the effort has been made to combine by hybridising the desirable characteristics of this small variety with those of larger and more productive types.

And when Collins found such a distinct difference in the appearance of normal and waxy maize endosperm, he suspected a difference in chemical composition, but the analysis did not yield any unusual results. The percentages of starch, oil, and protein were all within the normal range. Yet, he was intrigued by the physical nature of the starch, and wrote: "In view of the recent development of specialised maize products as human food, the unique type of starch may be of some economic importance." So actually, for many years the main use of waxy maize was a genetic marker for other maize breeding programs. Breeders were able to use some of the traits to "tag" the existence of hidden genes and follow them through breeding programs. It is possible that waxy maize would have become extinct again in the USA without this special application in breeding.

In 1922, another researcher, P. Weatherwax of Indiana University in Bloomington, reported that the starch in waxy maize was entirely of a "rare" form called "erythrodextrin", known today as amylopectin. He found that this rare starch stained red with iodine, in contrast to normal starch which stained blue. Bates, French et al. and Sprague, Brimhall, et al. confirmed that endosperm starch of waxy maize consists nearly exclusively of amylopectin. The presence of amylopectin in rice had been demonstrated previously by Parnell.

In 1937, just before World War II, G.F. Sprague and other plant breeders at what was then called Iowa State College had begun a crossbreeding program to attempt to introduce the waxy trait into a regular high-yielding hybrid maize. By this time, the waxy plant no longer had the peculiar structural traits noted by Collins, probably due to years of crossing into various genetic stocks. Only the unique endosperm had been retained. At this time, waxy maize was not so important because the main source of pure amylopectin still was the cassava plant, a tropical shrub with a large underground tuber.

During World War II, when the Japanese severed the supply lines of the States, processors were forced to turn to waxy maize. Waxy maize appeared to be especially suitable for this purpose because it could be milled with the same equipment already extensively used for ordinary maize. H. H. Schopmeyer has advised that the production of waxy maize in Iowa for industrial use amounted to approximately 356 metric tons in 1942 and 2540 tons in 1943. In 1944, there were only 5 varieties of waxy maize available for waxy starch production. In 1943, to cover all the special requirements for amylopectin, approximately 81650 tons of grains were produced. From World War II until 1971, all the waxy maize produced in the U.S. was grown under contract for food or industrial processors. In fact, most of the maize was grown in only a few counties in Iowa, Illinois, and Indiana.

But in 1970, the Southern corn leaf blight epidemic (Helminthosporium maydis Nisik. and Miyake) swept the U.S. corn belt. At the same time, at least 80% of the maize being grown in the U.S. was susceptible to the blight because this maize contained the "Texas type" male-sterile cytoplasm, which allowed production of hybrid seed without mechanical or hand detasseling. As a result, there was a scramble in 1971 to find any kind of maize that had normal cytoplasm – cytoplasm that would resist the blight. Consequently, some seed of waxy maize worked its way into the market. Through backcrossing, also has been used extensively to transfer individual genes such as wx (waxy), o2 (opaque 2) and the Htl gene for resistance to the leaf blight was transferred to regular dent corn.

Some farmers who fed this waxy grain to their beef cattle observed that animals thrived on it. Feeding trials were set up which suggested that the waxy maize produced more efficient weight gains than normal dent. Interest in waxy maize suddenly mushroomed, and this maize type abandoned the status of botanical curiosity and speciality product to become the subject of major research importance.

In 2002, an estimated 1,200,000 to 1,300,000 tonnes of waxy maize was produced in the United States on about 2,000 km2, representing only 0,5% of the total maize production.

Biology

Chinese maize
Collins noted, among others, these unusual traits of the Chinese maize:
Several unique structural features that enabled the plants to resist the drying out of the silks by wind at the time of flowering
Unusual growth behavior in that the top four or five leaves all appeared on the same side of the main stem of the plant. Extremely erect leaves of the upper nodes, while the lower leaves were more spread and drooping
One of the main things he noted was the composition of the endosperm of the maize kernels. He wrote: "The texture of the endosperm is one of the unique features of this maize. Cut in any direction it separates with a sort of cleavage, exposing a dull, smooth surface. The texture suggests that of the hardest waxes, though it is still harder and more crystalline. From this optical resemblance to wax the term cereous or waxy endosperm is suggested." The moisture content of the kernel must be 16% or lower before the waxy trait can be recognised visually.

The starch of normal dent maize is characterised by a content of about 25% amylose with the remainder being amylopectin and the intermediate fraction (see 3.5 Biochemistry). But these percentages vary among cultivars and with kernel development. For example, amylose percentage ranged from 20 to 36% for 399 cultivars of normal maize. There are maize germplasm collected that range from less than 20 to 100% complement of amylopectin. And waxy maize contains 100% amylopectin.

Waxy starch is of main interest because fractionation of normal starch to obtain pure amylose or amylopectin is very costly.

Waxy endosperm is inherently a defect in metabolism, and its low frequency in most maize populations in the face of recurring mutations indicates that it is acted against by natural selection.

Genetic drift
Experiments by Sprague have shown that ten to twenty plants are required for adequate representation of genetic diversity in an open-pollinated maize variety. Since the number of ears saved for seed by ancient Asian maize cultivators with only small plots of land at their disposal was often smaller than this and, indeed, since new maize populations are sometimes established by growing the progeny of a single ear, it follows that there must often have been genetic drift – changes in gene frequencies resulting from the creation of small breeding populations.

A striking example of genetic drift in maize is the occurrence in parts of Asia of varieties with waxy endosperm. In maize races of America such a variety is unknown, but the waxy character itself has been discovered in non-waxy varieties: in a New England flint maize and in a South American variety.

The fact that waxy maize occurs so commonly in a part of the world that also possesses waxy varieties of waxy rice, sorghum, and millet can be attributed to artificial selection. The people of Asia being familiar with waxy varieties of these cereals and accustomed to using them for special purposes recognised the waxy character in maize after it was introduced into Asia following the discovery of America and purposely isolated varieties purely for waxy endosperm. But the fact that waxy endosperm came to their attention in the first place is probably due to genetic drift. The gene for waxy endosperm, which has a low frequency in American maize, apparently attained a high frequency in certain samples of Asian maize.

Indeed, the practice reported by Stonor and Anderson of growing maize as single plants among other cereals would result in some degree of self-pollination and, in any stock in which the waxy gene was present, would inevitably lead in a very short time to the establishment of pure waxy varieties with special properties that people accustomed to the waxy character in other cereals could hardly fail to recognise.

Genetics
Genetic research of this genetic drift started first with describing the physical appearance (phenotyping) of the mutant maize. Later on these phenotypes were coupled to mutant genes genotypes. More than 40 mutant alleles are known for the waxy locus, making up the finest collection of mutations found among higher plants.

Some of these waxy mutants are very stable whereas others are very unstable. The genotype of the stable mutants remains unchanged whereas the one of unstable mutants changes because of the insertion of transposable elements (5-8). For a listing of all these mutations, the excellent book of Neuffer, Coe et al. is greatly recommended.

Because the waxy mutation is expressed in an easy identifiable nonlethal phenotype, it has been the subject of major research during the 20th century. Nelson made a fine structure genetic map of most of these mutations

 For waxy maize, a single recessive gene (wx) was located on the short arm of chromosome 9, codes for the waxy endosperm of the kernel (Wx codes for endosperm with normal starch). This was first shown by Collins and Kempton.
 The structure of the wildtype waxy (wx+) locus has been determined through DNA sequencing. The gene has 3718 bp (14 exons and 13 introns).
 Waxy endosperm is the counterpart in maize of the "glutinous" character in rice.
 There is a wide range of species also presenting the waxy mutation, including rice, sorghum, millet, barley and wheat, which were characterised by starch granules staining red with iodine.
 In crosses between heterozygous plants for the waxy character, a small but significant deviation from an expected Mendelian ratio in self-pollination is produced. Bear obtained from 71 segregated ears on the F1 generation 23,77% of waxy kernels and 76,23% of non-waxy kernels. This is evidenced by the two heterozygous types, Wx Wx wx and wx wx Wx.

The waxy gene is epistatic for all known other amylose and amylopectine forming mutants genes like dull (du), sugary-1 (su1 ) and sugary-2 (su2),. wx gene for example increases sugars and water-soluble polysaccharides (WSP) in a su1 background and it causes dramatic increases in sugars and reduction in starch with ae or aedu mutated genes.

 The mutation from Wx to wx is not uncommon in Corn Belt varieties, Bear having found three separate mutations to waxy in three consecutive years in a total population of some 100,000 selfed ears.
 Mangelsdorf found also many mutants on his trial fields.
 Argentine waxy (wx-a) corn, an allele at the waxy locus first reported by Andrés and Bascialli, is known to produce small amount of amylose (< 5%) and gives an intermediate staining reaction with iodine.
 Other mutant alleles at the waxy locus have been reported which possess similar starch properties to those observed with wx.

Genotype and characterisation with iodine
The wx locus is expressed in the endosperm, in the male gametophyte (pollen) as well as in the female gametophyte (embryo sac). Amylose and amylopectin have different iodine binding-properties, with maize amylose and amylopectin giving iodine affinity (IA) values of about 19 to 20 and 1%, respectively, depending upon the source. Weatherwax discovered this process in 1922.

The amount of apparent amylose can be determined either by measuring the absorbency of the starch-iodine complex (blue-value) and relating this value to that of pure amylose and amylopectin standards or by measuring the amount of iodine (mg) bound per 100 mg of starch in a potentiometric titration and relating the value to the amount bound by an amylose standard.

Values used on the iodine binding, however, are only estimates of amylose content because of differences in the binding abilities (and structure) of amylose and amylopectin among starch types. For example, amylopectin molecules with long external branches bind more iodine than those with short branches do, resulting in a small measure of apparent amylose.

Chromatographic profiles of wx-containing starches, however, reveal no amylose peak. The wavelength at which a starch-iodine complex has maximum absorbency is referred to as the lambda max.

Plants which are heterozygous on the waxy gene (Wx:wx) can be characterised by staining the pollen with iodine. Half of the pollen will be blue and half brown whereas the kernels will stay blue (very helpful in backcrossing program). If the plant is homozygous recessive (wx:wx) the whole pollen will be brown and the kernel too. Being homozygously dominant (Wx:Wx) the iodine will appear only blue.

Biochemistry
Normal dent maize has two different pathways for starch formation one leading to branched chain (amylopectin) and the other to straight-chain polysaccharides (amylose).
 The amylopectin consists of chain of α-D-(1-4) and α-D-(1-6)-glucosidic linkages that form a branched molecule.
 Amylose is primarily linear with α-D-(1-4)-linked glucose residues.

The locus Wx codes for a specific starch granule-bound enzyme, NDP-glucose-starch glucosyltransferase. This specific starch synthase enzyme is responsible for amylose biosynthesis. The Wx gen catalyses the 1–4 linkage from glucose residues to amylose synthesis in the developing endosperm. This enzyme is located in the amyloplasts and is the major component of the starchbound protein in maize. Nelson showed that starch granules from wx wx wx endosperm had very low starch granule-bound glucosyltransferase activity.

When measuring if the activity of the transferase was a function of the Wx dosage in diploid and tetraploid maize, Akatsuka noticed a linear proportionality between a preparation of Wx Wx Wx and Wx Wx Wx Wx Wx Wx . Nevertheless, the amylose content was the same in both types, suggesting that activity of the transferase is not directly linked to the amylose content.

In maize and some other plants, there is evidence of a starch molecule that is intermediate in size to amylose and amylopectin. The intermediate fraction contains chains of (1–4)-linked alpha-D-anhydroglucose residues, but the average length of these chains and the number of chains per molecule are different from those in either amylopectin or amylose. Several researchers demonstrated the presence in normal maize starch of about 5 to 7% intermediate polysaccharides, basing their conclusions on indirect evidence from IA.

As early as in 1956, it was stated that amylopectin contained three different types of chains. In each macromolecule there is one C-chain, which carries the only reducing group. The B-chains are linked to the macromolecules linked by their potential reducing group, and may contain one or more A-chains that are similarly linked. The ratio of A-B chains (1:1 to 1,5:1) is a measure of the degree of multiple branching and is an important property describing amylopectin. Nevertheless, the exact arrangement of chains within the amylopectin molecule is still not clear.

Combining the recessive mutant (wx) maize variant with other mutant as for example amylose extender (ae)maize and dull (du) maize has an effect on the amylose and amylopectine structure of the starch.
 The amylose extender waxy (aewx) starch contain 21% apparent amylose and has a lambda max. of 580 for the iodine-starch complex. The aewx outer chains are longer than those of wx mutant and fewer in number per weight of starch. In general, the aewx starch had a unique structure that is similar to the anomalous amylopectin (intermediate fraction) reported in ae starch.
 Increased dosage at the ae locus, regardless of the genotype at the wx locus, resulted in amylopectin with increased linearity.
 Short-chained amylose (approximately 100 glucose units) was observed in all ae genotypes in a homozygous Wx background.
 Amylopectin of the aewx mutants had an increased proportion of long B-chains and a decreased proportion of short B-chains compared with wx amylopectin, whereas amylopectin of the dull waxy (duwx) mutant had a decreased proportion of long B-chains and an increased proportion of short B-chains, thus confirming the novel nature of aewx and duwx amylopectin.

Agronomic features
Producing waxy maize starch on an industrial scale requires extra measures compared to standard dent maize.

New varieties with the waxy locus are relatively easy to breed through back-crossing breeding with dent maize varieties, but their productivity is approximately 3 to 10% less than that of dent maize.

Due to the waxy gene being recessive, waxy maize has to be isolated from any nearby dent maize fields by at least 200 meters to prevent cross-pollination. Volunteer dent maize plants sprouting from the  previous year's debris are also a problem. A few dent maize volunteers in a waxy field will be enough to contaminate the whole field, resulting in dent grains instead of waxy grains with amylopectin starch.

Almost all waxy grain is produced under contract for starch (wet milling) companies. A premium is paid as compensation for the extra costs incurred from the lower yield and the extra handling, such as quality control procedures to ensure starch in the grain is not contaminated.

Utilization
Amylopectin or waxy cornstarch is relatively easy to gelatinise, produces a clear viscous paste with a sticky or tacky surface. The paste rheology resembles pastes of root or tuber starches, such as potato starch or tapioca starch (made from cassava). Amylopectine starch have also a lower tendency to retrogradate and are thus more viscosity stable. These different properties compared to normal dent corn starch, containing also amylose, are utilized mainly in following different applications.

Food products

Modified waxy maize starches are used for the improvement of uniformity, stability, and texture in various food products. The clarity and viscous stability of amylopectin starch make it especially suitable for thickening fruit pies. It improves smoothness and creaminess of canned food and dairy products as well as freeze-thaw stability of frozen foods. It gives a more desirable texture and appearance to dry foods and mixes [24]. Waxy maize starch is also the preferred starting material for the production of maltodextrins because of improved water solubility after drying and greater solution stability and clarity.

Waxy corn on the cob is popular in China and Southeast Asia, and may be found in frozen or precooked forms in Chinatowns. Waxy corn is the most popular corn in China for fresh consumption. The waxy texture is familiar and preferred by people in East Asia since items such as tapioca pearls, glutinous rice, and mochi have similar textures.

Adhesive industry
Starch from waxy maize differs from regular maize starch in both molecular structure and pasting characteristics. Pastes made from waxy starch are long and cohesive, whereas pastes made from regular maize starch are short and heavy bodied. Waxy maize starch is a major starch component in adhesives used for making bottle labels. This waxy starch-based adhesive imparts resolubilizing resistance to the labels which prevents their soaking off the bottle if immersed in water or being subjected to very high humidity conditions. waxy maize starches are commonly used in the US for the manufacture of gummed tapes and envelope adhesives.

Livestock, dairy and poultry feeding research
The research in feeding of waxy maize began in the 1940s. Beginning with a research report in 1944, waxy maize seemed to have the potential to increase feed conversion efficiencies compared to dent maize. Many other feeding trials were started and generally indicated a slight to clear positive advantage for feeding waxy grain.  Increases of both milk production and butterfat content for lactating dairy cattle, increase in daily weight gains in fattening lambs and when fed to finishing beef cattle.

Still the extensive (mushroomed) agro-research did not lead to any large scale use in the feed industry due to analytical research analysing the pancreatic digestibility of starches of several genotypes. Waxy starch of the genome type ae, as also the genome type du and su2, for starches with a high amylose content, show an excellent digestibility. Thus, amylopectin, waxy starches  alone, cannot be correlated to good digestibility. Sandsted suggests that digestibility could lie more in the structure of starch granule, in differences in bonding of the starch molecules and in possible anomalous linkages between the molecules.

See also
 Amylomaize high amylose maize starch
 Waxy potato starch
 Glutinous rice
 Binatog, a Filipino waxy corn dessert

References

Vegetables
Maize varieties
Starch
Edible thickening agents